Niklas Mattsson (born 27 May 1968) is a retired Swedish football defender.

References

1968 births
Living people
Swedish footballers
IFK Trelleborg players
Trelleborgs FF players
Association football defenders
Allsvenskan players